The Ship for Southeast Asian and Japanese Youth Program (東南アジア青年の船 Tōnan-ajia-seinen-no-fune?), commonly referred to as The Ship for Southeast Asian Youth Program and SSEAYP ,  , is an annual youth exchange program organised by the Cabinet Office of Japan and governments of Southeast Asian countries for the purpose of promoting friendship and mutual understanding among the youths of eleven Southeast Asian countries and Japan, to broaden their perspective on the world, and furthermore, to strengthen their spirit of international cooperation and practical skills for international collaboration. Since its inception in 1974, the program has organised 46 international voyages attended by youth delegations sent by governments of respective members.

Four cruise ships have been deployed by the CaO for the journeys.

Purpose 
The purpose of SSEAYP is to promote friendship and mutual understanding among the youths of the ten Southeast Asian countries and Japan, to broaden their perspective to the world, and furthermore, to strengthen their spirit of international cooperation and practical skills for international collaboration.

History 
SSEAYP is an annual programme sponsored by the Japanese Cabinet Office and supported by the member-countries of ASEAN. The programme brings together more than 300 youths from ASEAN countries and Japan, providing them with the unique opportunity to live together on board the ship  for over 40 days.

SSEAYP started in January 1974 based on Joint Statements issued between Japan and the five ASEAN countries, namely, Indonesia, Malaysia, Philippines, Singapore and Thailand. Brunei Darussalam joined in 1985. Viet Nam joined the programme in 1995 while the Lao People's Democratic Republic and Myanmar joined in 1998, Cambodia in 2000.

Organizers

Selection of Participants

Program Outline

On Board Activities 
- Discussion Group (DG)

- Solidarity Group Activity (SG Activity)

- Participating Youth Seminar (PY Seminar)

- Voluntary Activity (VA)

- National Presentation (NP)

- Flag Hoisting

Port-of-Call Activities 
- Courtesy Calls

- Institutional Visits

- Interaction with Local Youths

- Homestay Program

Working Language 
The official working language for the program is English.

Post-Program Activities (PPA)

Participating Countries

Cruise Ships in Use

SSEAYP International General Assembly (SIGA) 

1985 Singapore

1. 1988	Malaysia (Kuala Lumpur)

2. 1989 	Philippines (Quezon City)

3. 1990 	Brunei Darussalam (Bandar Seri Begawan)

4. 1991 	Indonesia (Jakarta)

5. 1992 	Singapore

6. 1993 	Thailand (Bangkok)

7. 1994 	Japan (Tokyo)

8. 1995 	Malaysia (Kuala Lumpur, Genting Highlands)

9. 1996 	Philippines (Pasay)

10. 1997 	Brunei Darussalam (Bandar Seri Begawan)

11. 1998 	Philippines (Clark)

12. 1999 	Singapore

13. 2000 	Indonesia (Bali)

14. 2001 	Thailand (Bangkok, Ko Samet)

15. 2002 	Japan (Tokyo)

16. 2004 	Malaysia (Kuala Lumpur, Malacca)

17. 2005 	Viet Nam (Hanoi, Halong Bay)

18. 2006 	Brunei Darussalam (Bandar Seri Begawan)

19. 2007 	Cambodia (Siem Reap)

20. 2008 	Philippines (Cebu)

21. 2009 	Indonesia (Yogyakarta)

22. 2010 	Thailand (Ayutthaya)

23. 2011 	Singapore

24. 2012 	Japan (Tokyo)

25. 2013 	Lao P.D.R. (Vientiane)

26. 2014 	Malaysia (Langkawi)

27. 2015 	Viet Nam (Hanoi, Halong Bay)

28. 2016 	Cambodia (Siem Reap)

29. 2017 	Philippines (Iloilo, Boracay)

30. 2018 	Indonesia (Bandung)

31. 2019 	Brunei Darussalam (Bandar Seri Begawan)

32. 2022    Japan (Online)

Alumni Organisations 

Secretariat

SSEAYP International (coordinated with IYEO)

Full Member

Brunei Darussalam	: Persatuan BERSATU (SSEAYP International Brunei Darussalam/SI Brunei Darussalam)

Cambodia		: SSEAYP International Cambodia (SI Cambodia)

Indonesia		: SSEAYP International Indonesia, Inc. (SI Indonesia/SII)

Japan			: IYEO (International Youth Exchange Organization of Japan)

Malaysia		: KABESA (SSEAYP International Malaysia/SI Malaysia)

Myanmar			: Association for Youth Development Myanmar (SSEAYP International Myanmar/SI Myanmar)

Philippines		: SSEAYP International Philipplines, Inc. (SI Philippines/SIP)

Singapore		: SSEAYP International Singapore (SI Singapore/SIS)

Thailand		: Association of the Ship for Southeast Asian Youth of Thailand (SSEAYP International Thailand/SI Thailand)

Associate Member

Lao P.D.R.		: Lao SSEAYP Alumni Association (LSAA)

Viet Nam		: Vietnam Alumni Club of Youth Friendship Exchange Programs (VACYF)

Data is per 24 March 2022

External links 
 Official page on CaO website (Japanese only)
 SSEAYP International

Education in Japan
Student exchange
Cruise ships
Foreign relations of Japan